In mathematics the signal-to-noise statistic distance between two vectors a and b with mean values  and  and standard deviation  and  respectively is:

In the case of Gaussian-distributed data and unbiased class distributions, this statistic can be related to classification accuracy given an ideal linear discrimination, and a decision boundary can be derived. 

This distance is frequently used to identify vectors that have significant difference. One usage is in bioinformatics to locate genes that are differential expressed on microarray experiments.

See also
Distance
Uniform norm
Manhattan distance
Signal-to-noise ratio
Signal to noise ratio (imaging)

Notes

Statistical distance
Statistical ratios